Karan Singh Yadav (born 1 February 1945) is a former Indian politician who was a member of the 16th Lok Sabha. He represented Alwar constituency of Rajasthan, and was a member of the Indian National Congress (INC) political party. He also served as the president of Rajasthan Yadav Mahasabha. He was an INS candidate in the 2018 assembly elections from the Kishangarh Bas constituency. He had four brothers and sisters, and his father Ganpat Singh Yadav was an educated personality and was associated with the royal family of Bikaner. He died in 1989 due to cardiac arrest. Yadav's mother Sharbati Devi died from cancer in 1981.

References

External links
 Official biographical sketch in Parliament of India website
 Indian National Congress Party Bio
 Cong nominates Karan Singh Yadav for Alwar Lok Sabha bypoll

1945 births
Living people
Indian National Congress politicians
Rajasthani politicians
India MPs 2004–2009
India MPs 2014–2019
People from Bikaner
Lok Sabha members from Rajasthan
People from Alwar district
Indian National Congress politicians from Rajasthan